Starks Public School is a K-12 school in Starks, Louisiana, United States. It is a part of Calcasieu Parish Public Schools.

 the school had 351 students. The high school had an enrollment of 101 students.

Athletics
Starks High athletics competes in the LHSAA.

References

External links
 Starks High School

Schools in Calcasieu Parish, Louisiana
Public high schools in Louisiana